Frederick "Fred" Ernest Tisue (born October 17, 1938) is an American water polo player who competed in the 1960 Summer Olympics.

He was born in Ames, Iowa.

Tisue was a member of the American water polo team which finished seventh in the 1960 tournament. He played all seven matches and scored twelve goals.

External links
 

1938 births
Living people
American male water polo players
Olympic water polo players of the United States
Water polo players at the 1960 Summer Olympics
People from Ames, Iowa